Athirathan is a 1991 Indian Malayalam film, directed by Pradeep Kumar. The film stars Suresh Gopi, Geetha, Jagathy Sreekumar and KPAC Lalitha in the lead roles. The film has musical score by Johnson.

Cast
Suresh Gopi as Sethu
Geetha as Devu
Jagathy Sreekumar as Shivaraman
KPAC Lalitha as Meenakshi
Suchitra as Nimmy
Siddique as James
Risabava as Benny Fernandez
Vijayaraghavan as Chandru
Prathapachandran as Andrew Georeg
Rajan P. Dev as Govinda Bhattacharya 
James as Raghavan
M. S. Thripunithura as Advocate
Paravoor Bharathan as Kochettan
Zainuddin as Abu
Keerikkadan Jose as Gunda

Soundtrack
The music was composed by Johnson and the lyrics were written by Bichu Thirumala.

References

1991 films
1990s Malayalam-language films